BMJ is a British publisher of medical journals, and healthcare knowledge provider of clinical decision tools, online educational resources, and events. Established in 1840, the company is owned by the British Medical Association. The company was branded as BMJ Group until 2013.

Publications 
 1840: Provincial Medical and Surgical Journal (later renamed the British Medical Journal) first published
 1847: James Simpson uses the journal to publicise chloroform, which paved the way for modern anaesthetic techniques
 1867: Joseph Lister publishes his introduction to the concept of antiseptic in wound healing
 1950: Richard Doll publishes his discovery of the link between tobacco consumption and lung cancer
 1958: Alice Stewart publishes her study of the risks of low-level radiation
 1995: First website

Campaigns 
 1865-71: Baby farming - BMJ was largely responsible for the Infant Life Protection Act of 1872, directed against the lucrative practice of baby farming. The BMJ led a series of exposures which forced an inquiry into the state of London's work-house infirmaries.

See also 
 BMJ Open
 BMJ academic journals
 Open Access Scholarly Publishers Association, of which BMJ is a member

References 

Publishing companies of the United Kingdom
Academic publishing companies
Publishing companies established in 1840
1840 establishments in England
Companies based in the London Borough of Camden
British companies established in 1840